Maxam Explosives is one of the largest explosives manufacturers in the world, with its headquarters in Madrid. In Germany, the plants of the former WASAG belongs to Maxam.

The company traces its roots back to the Sociedad Española de la Pólvora Dinamita, founded by Alfred Nobel, which changed its name to Unión Española de Explosivos (UEE) in 1896. In 1970, UEE merged with Río Tinto, creating Unión Explosivos Río Tinto (ERT). ERT is privatised in 1994 and renames itself Maxam in 2006.

The company is 45% owned by Advent International and 55% by management.

Reference 

Explosives manufacturers